Muricauda aquimarina  is a Gram-negative, non-spore-forming and slightly halophilic bacterium from the genus of Muricauda. which has been isolated from a salt lake near the beach of Hwajinpo in Korea.

References

External links
Type strain of Muricauda aquimarina at BacDive -  the Bacterial Diversity Metadatabase

Further reading 
 
 

Flavobacteria
Bacteria described in 2005